St Thomas' Church, Bath Row, is a former Church of England parish church in Birmingham.

History

It was built as a Commissioners' church. The foundation stone of the church was laid by Folliott Cornewall, Bishop of Worcester, on 22 October 1826 and the church was built to designs of the architect Thomas Rickman at a cost of £14,220 and consecrated by Cornewall on 29 October 1829. It was for a time the largest church in Birmingham, seating 2,600.

During the Chartist riots of 1839, crowds took railings from around the churchyard to use as pikes.

Part of the parish was taken to form the parish of St Asaph's when this was consecrated in 1868.

It was restored in 1893 under the supervision of the architect Frank Barlow Osborn when the old high-back pews and pew platforms were removed, the church was cleaned and renovated, and the organ restored by Walter James Bird of Birmingham, all at a cost of £1,200.

On the night of 11 December 1940, during World War II, all but the tower and classical west portico was destroyed by German bombs. The parish was united with Immanuel Church, which had closed in 1939, and Immanuel Church was reopened.

The remaining portico and tower have been preserved and are now part of St Thomas' Peace Garden.

Rectors
William Marsh 1829–1842
Edward Bird 1842–1847 (formerly rector of Tattenhall, Cheshire)
George S. Bull 1847–1864 (formerly incumbent at St Matthew's Church, Duddeston and Nechells)
Charles Thomas Wilkinson 1864–1870 (formerly incumbent at Attercliffe, Sheffield, afterwards Vicar of St Andrew's Church, Plymouth)
Thomas D. Halsted 1870–1888 (formerly Vicar of St Paul's Church, Greenwich, afterwards Vicar of Little Hereford, Tenbury)
F. S. Webster 1888–1898
Walter George Whicker 1898–1910
W. J. Sheppard 1910–1919
C. T. Aston 1919
J. Bell 1920–1929  (formerly vicar of St Paul's Leyton and St John's Walthamstow, afterwards Vicar of St Mary's Church, Harrogate)
Douglas Barton

Organ
A new organ was installed by Bishop of London and opened on 24 November 1837 by George Hollins. It was rebuilt and enlarged in 1861 by Mr Bosward when it was equipped with three manuals (choir manual of 8 or 9 stops prepared for) with 12 stops on the Great, 10 on the Swell and 4 on the pedal (1 prepared for). The organ was renovated again in 1893 when three new stops were added by Walter James Bird of Cregoe Street, Birmingham.

Organists
Mr. Chapman c. 1841 – c. 1849
Alfred J. Sutton 1865–1870
John Pearce 1870–1882 (formerly organist of St Paul's Church, Birmingham)
Paul Smith 1882–1888
Alfred Ashdown Box 1888–1928

References

Churches bombed by the Luftwaffe in Birmingham, West Midlands
Churches completed in 1829
Church of England church buildings in Birmingham, West Midlands
Commissioners' church buildings
Destroyed churches in England
Organizations disestablished in 1940
Grade II listed churches in Birmingham
Thomas Rickman buildings